The Sea Nymphs is a 1914 American short comedy film directed by and starring Fatty Arbuckle.

Cast
 Minta Durfee - Fatty's wife
 Charles Avery - Mabel's father
 Ford Sterling - Man on beach
 Roscoe 'Fatty' Arbuckle
 Alice Davenport - Fatty's mother in law
 Mabel Normand
 Al St. John
 Mack Swain

See also
 Fatty Arbuckle filmography

External links

1914 films
Films directed by Roscoe Arbuckle
1914 comedy films
1914 short films
American silent short films
American black-and-white films
Silent American comedy films
American comedy short films
1910s American films